In rock climbing, a first free ascent (FFA) is the first documented redpoint, onsight or flash of a single-pitch, big wall (multi-pitch), or boulder route that did not involve using aid equipment to help progression or resting; the ascent must therefore be performed in either a sport, a traditional, or a free solo manner.  First-free-ascents that set new grade milestones are important events in rock climbing history, and are listed below.  While sport climbing has dominated absolute-grade milestones since the mid-1980s (i.e. are now the highest grades), milestones for modern traditional climbing, free solo climbing, onsighted, and flashed ascents, are also listed.

A route's grade is provisional until enough climbers have repeated the route to have a "consensus". At the highest grades, this can take years as few climbers are capable of repeating these routes.  For example, in 2001, Realization was considered the world's first , however, the first repeat of the 1996 route , which only happened in 2008, suggested that it was possibly the first .  Open Air has had no further repeats, and has had holds broken since 1996, whereas Realization has had many ascents and is thus a "consensus" 9a+. Therefore, where known, the 2nd, 3rd, and 4th ranked candidates are also chronicled.

Single-pitch routes

Redpointed by men 

:

 Silence (also Project Hard) – Flatanger (NOR) – September 3, 2017 – First ascent by Adam Ondra, who described it as "much harder than anything else" he had previously done, and cautiously suggested the 9c rating for the 45 m route.  Remains unrepeated (June 2022).

 – Verdon Gorge (FRA) – April 29, 2022 – First ascent by Sébastien Bouin who proposed the grade of 9c, saying "Comparing this route to Bibliographie, Move, Beyond [Integral], it seems a step ahead", and "To choose 9c is to take a risk". Remains unrepeated (June 2022).

:

 – Flatanger – October 4, 2012 – First-ever 9b+, by Adam Ondra; grade confirmed by Stefano Ghisolfi (2020). The third ascent was by Seb Bouin (2022), who felt that the use of a kneebar made the grade closer to  (5.15b/c).
 La Dura Dura – Oliana (ESP) – February 7, 2013 – Second-ever 9b+, by Adam Ondra; first-ever 9b+ repeat by Chris Sharma (2013).
 Vasil Vasil – Moravský Kras (CZE) – December 4, 2013 – Third-ever 9b+, by Adam Ondra. Remains unrepeated (June 2022).
Perfecto Mundo – Margalef (ESP) – May 9, 2018 – Fourth-ever 9b+, by Alexander Megos; repeat by Stefano Ghisolfi (2018), and Jakob Schubert (2019).

:

 Jumbo Love – Clark Mountain (United States) – September 11, 2008 – First-ever , by Chris Sharma. Repeated by Ethan Pringle (2015), Jonathan Siegrist (2018), and Seb Bouin (2022).
  – Siurana (ESP) – December 17, 2008 – Second-ever , by Chris Sharma. First-ever 9b repeat by Adam Ondra (2010) (was Ondra's first 9b).
 Neanderthal – Santa Linya (ESP) – December 18, 2009 – Third-ever , by Chris Sharma. Repeated by Jakob Schubert (2018), and Adam Ondra (2019).

:

 Mutation — Raven Tor, Peak District (ENG) – 1998 – First ascent by Steve McClure, who graded it .
 Realization – Céüse (FRA) – July 2001 – First ascent by Chris Sharma. First consensus  in history.
 La Rambla – Siurana (ESP) – March 2003 – First ascent by Ramón Julián Puigblanqué. Second consensus  in history.

:

 Action Directe – Frankenjura – 1991 – First-ever consensus 9a in history, by Wolfgang Güllich, who originally graded it 8c+ (it held back other potential 9as), but it is now the "benchmark" for 9a.
 Om – Schleier Waterfall (AUT) – 1992 – Second-ever consensus 9a in history, by Alexander Huber.
  – Saint Loup (SUI) – 1993 – Third-ever consensus 9a in history, by Fred Nicole.
 Hugh – Les Eaux-Claires (FRA) – 1993 – Fourth-ever consensus 9a in history, by Fred Rouhling.

:

 Liquid Ambar – Pen Trwyn, (WAL)  – May 1990 – First ascent by Jerry Moffatt who graded , but now regraded to 8c+.
 Hubble – Raven Tor, Peak District (ENG)  – June 1990 – Considered first-ever consensus  in history, by Ben Moon; possible first 9a.
 Just Do It – Smith Rocks, (United States)  – 1992 – Considered second-ever consensus  in history (after Hubble), by Jean-Baptiste Tribout.
 Super Plafond – Volx, (FRA)  – 1994 – Considered third-ever consensus  in history, by Jean-Baptiste Tribout.

:

  – Frankenjura (DEU) – 1987 – First-ever consensus  in history, by Wolfgang Güllich.
 Anaïs et le canabis – Saint Loup (SUI) – 1988 – Second-ever consensus  in history, by Fred Nicole. 
 Agincourt – Buoux (FRA) – 1989 – Third-ever consensus  in history, by Ben Moon. 
 Maginot Line (Plafond) – Volx (FRA) – 1989 – Fourth-ever consensus  in history, by Ben Moon.

:

 Punks in the Gym – Mount Arapiles (AUS) – 1985 – First-ever consensus   in history, by Wolfgang Güllich.
 To Bolt or Not to Be – Smith Rocks, (United States)  – 1986 – Third-ever consensus  in history, by Jean-Baptiste Tribout.

:

 Kanal im Rücken – Frankenjura (DEU) – 1984 – First-ever consensus  in history, by Wolfgang Güllich.

 – Altmühltal (DEU) – 1983 – First-ever consensus  in history, by Jerry Moffatt.

Pre-sport era

Many of the notable first ascents that achieved a new highest grade pre The Face are traditional climbing routes:

13 Boulevard du Vol – Rochers de Freyr, (BEL) – 1981 – Second-ever consensus  in history, by Arnould t'Kint.
Grand Illusion – Sugar Loaf, Lake Tahoe, CA (United States) – 1982 – Third-ever consensus  in history, by Wolfgang Gullich.
La Crépinette – Les Eaux-Claires (FRA) – 1983 – Fourth-ever consensus  in history, by Fabrice Guillot (and first 8a in France).

The Phoenix – Yosemite, CA (United States) – 1977 – Considered the first-ever consensus  in history, by Ray Jardine (used his new cams).
Le Toit – Baou de Quatre Ouro (FRA) – 1981 – Second-ever consensus  in history, by Patrick Edlinger.
Le Haine – La Turbie (FRA) – March, 1981 – Third-ever consensus  in history, by Patrick Berhault.
Chimpanzodrome – Le Saussois (FRA) – April, 1981 – Fourth-ever consensus  in history, by Jean-Pierre Bouvier.

Psycho Roof – Eldorado, CO (United States) – 1975 – Estimated as the first-ever  in history, by Steve Wunsch; only one ascent, due to large broken flake, and was possibly harder than 7c in 1975. 
Nymphodalle – Les Calanques (FRA) – 1979 – Sometimes considered first-ever consensus  in history, by Patrick Edlinger.
Chasin' the trane – Frankenjura (GER) – 1980 – Considered one of the earliest consensus  climbs in history, by John Bachar.

Macabre Roof – Ogden, Utah, (United States) – 1967 – First  in history (on contemporary regrading, still very few ascents), flashed by Greg Lowe
Paisano Overhang – Suicide Rock, (United States) – 1974 – One of the first-ever consensus  climbs, by John Long.
Super Crack – Shawangunks, (United States) – 1974 – Long considered the first-ever consensus  by Steve Wunsch.
Super Crack – Shawangunks, (United States) – 1977 – First-ever repeat of a consensus , by Ron Kauk.

English Hanging Gardens – Big Rock, Lake Perris, California, (United States) – 1970 – Regraded to be the first  in history, by John Gosling
Kansas City – Shawangunks, NY (United States) – 1973 – One of the first-ever  climbs in history, by John Bragg.
Fish Crack – Yosemite (United States) – 1975 – One of the first-ever  climbs in history, by Henry Barber.
Hot Line – Yosemite (United States) – 1975 – One of the first-ever  climbs in history, by Ron Kauk, and John Bachar (both led).

Thimble – Needles, SD, (United States) – 1961 – First-ever  in history, by John Gill. Free soloed.
The Throne – Shawangunks, NY (United States) – 1973 – Very early  climbs in history, by John Stannard.
Fenrir – Verdon Gorge (FRA) – 1977 – Early consensus  in France, by Patrick Berhault (first in France).
Caca Boudin – Verdon Gorge (FRA) – 1977 – Early consensus  in history, by Patrick Berhault.
Separate Reality – Yosemite (United States) – 1978 – Early consensus  in history, by Ron Kauk.

Goliath – Burbage South Edge, (ENG) – 1958 – Possible first-ever  at E4 6a (6c+ to 7a), by Don Whillans.
Foops – Shawangunks, NY (United States) – 1967 October – Often considered a first-ever consensus , by John Stannard (now closer to 6c+). 
Messner Slab – Pilastro di Mezzo, Sas dla Crusc/Heiligkreuzkofel, (ITA) – 1968 – Contemporary regrading implies it was a very early , led on sight by Reinhold Messner.
Schwager Nordwand – Schrammsteine, Saxon Switzerland, (DEU) – 1970 – Considered a notable early  IXb, by Bernd Arnold.

Redpointed by women 

:

 La Planta de Shiva – Villanueva del Rosario (ESP) – October 22, 2017 – First-ever female ascent of a 9b route, by Angela Eiter.
 Eagle–4 – Saint-Léger-du-Ventoux (FRA) – November 7, 2020 – Second-ever female ascent of a 9b, by Julia Chanourdie.
 Madame Ching – Tyrol (AUT) – December 16, 2020 – Third female 9b, and first-ever female FFA of a 9b, by Angela Eiter; unrepeated.
 Erebor – Eremo di San Paolo, Arco (ITA) – October 2, 2021 – Fourth-ever female ascent of a 9b (downgraded from 9b+), by Laura Rogora.

:

 La Rambla – Siurana (ESP) – February 26, 2017 – First-ever female ascent of a 9a+ route, by Margo Hayes.
 Sweet neuf – Pierrot Beach (FRA) – September 11, 2017 – Second-ever female ascent, and first-ever female FFA of a 9a+, by Anak Verhoeven.
 Realization – Céüse (FRA) – September 24, 2017 – Third-ever female ascent of a 9a+ route, by Margo Hayes.
 Papichulo – Oliana (ESP) – March 22, 2019 – Fourth-ever female ascent of a 9a+ route, by Margo Hayes.

:

 Bimbaluna – Saint Loup (SUI) – 1 May 2005 – World's first-ever female ascent of a 9a/9a+ route, by Josune Bereziartu.
 Open your Mind direct – Santa Linya (ESP) 17 March 2015 – Second female ascent of a 9a/9a+ route (once a potential first 9a+), by Ashima Shiraishi.

:

 – Saint Loup (SUI) – October 29, 2002 – First-ever female ascent of a 9a route, by Josune Bereziartu.
 Logical Progression – Jo Yama (JPN) – November, 2004 – Second-ever female ascent of a 9a route, by Josune Bereziartu.
 PuntX – Gorges du Loup, (FRA) – November, 2013 – Fourth-ever female ascent of a 9a route, by Muriel Sarkany.

:

 Honky Tonk Mix – Onate (ESP) – June, 2000 – First-ever female ascent of an 8c+ route, by Josune Bereziartu.
 Noia – Andonno (ITA) – October, 2001 – Second-ever female ascent of an 8c+ route, by Josune Bereziartu.
 Na Nai – Baltzola (ESP) – June 18, 2003 – Third-ever female ascent of an 8c+ route, by Josune Bereziartu.
 Powerade – Vadiello (ESP) – May 21, 2007 – Fourth-ever female ascent of an 8c+ route, by Josune Bereziartu.

:
 Honky Tonky – Onate (ESP) – April, 1998 – First-ever female ascent of an 8c route, by Josune Bereziartu.
 White Zombie – Baltzola (ESP) – May, 1999 – Second-ever female ascent of an 8c route, by Josune Bereziartu.
 Raz – Baltzola (ESP) – May, 1999 – Third-ever female ascent of an 8c route, by Josune Bereziartu.
 Welcome to Tijuana – Rodellar (ESP) – May, 2000 – Fourth-ever female ascent of an 8c route, by Josune Bereziartu.

:

 Masse Critique – Cimai (FRA) – 1990 – First-ever female ascent of an 8b+ route, by Lynn Hill.
 No Sika, No Crime – Lehn (CHF) – 1993 – Second-ever female ascent of an 8b route, by Suzi Good.
 Silence Vertical – Troubat (FRA) – 1993 – Third-ever female ascent of an 8b route, by Robyn Erbesfield.
 Attention on vous regarde – Saint-Antonin-Noble-Val (FRA) – 1993 – Fourth-ever female ascent of an 8b route, by Robyn Erbesfield.

:

 Sortilèges – Le Cimai (FRA) – 1988 – First-ever female ascent of an 8b route, by Isabelle Patissier.
 Sortilèges – Le Cimai (FRA) – 1989 – Second-ever female ascent of an 8b route, by Lynn Hill.

:

 Choucas – Buoux (FRA) – March 1988 – First-ever female ascent of an 8a+ route, by Catherine Destivelle.

:

 Rêve de Papillon – Buoux (FRA) – 1987 – Third-ever female ascent of an 8a route, by Lynn Hill.
 Rêve de Papillon – Buoux (FRA) – 1988 – Fourth-ever female ascent of an 8a route, by Catherine Destivelle.

:

 Fleur de Rocaille – Mouriès, (FRA) – 1985 – First-ever female ascent of an 7c+/8a route, by Catherine Destivelle; was first 8a, but grade softened.

Pre-sport era

Many of the notable first female ascents that achieved a new highest grade pre Fleur de Rocaille, are traditional climbing routes:

:
 Vandals – Shawangunk Mountains (United States) – 1984 – First-ever female ascent of a 7c+ route, by Lynn Hill.
 Artificial Intelligence – Shawangunk Mountains (United States) – 1985 – Second-ever female ascent of a 7c+ route, by Lynn Hill.

:
 Ophir Broke – Telluride (United States) – 1979 – First-ever female ascent of a 7c route (subsequently upgraded), by Lynn Hill.
 Organic Iron –  Shawangunk Mountains (United States) – 1984 – Second-ever female ascent of a 7c route (was considered first), by Lynn Hill.
 Katapult –  	Frankenjura (GER) – 1985 – Third-ever female ascent of a 7c route, by Isabelle Patissier.

:
 Yellow Crack Variation – Shawangunk Mountains (United States) – 1984 – First-ever female ascent of a 7b+ route, by Lynn Hill.
 Pichenibule (en libre) – Verdon Gorge (FRA) – 1985 – Second-ever female ascent of a 7b+ route, by Catherine Destivelle.

:
 Shawangunk Ridge – Shawangunk Mountains (United States) – 1977 – First-ever female ascent of a 7b route, by Lynn Hill.
 Kansas City – Shawangunk Mountains (United States) – 1977 – Early female ascent of a 7b route, by Barbara Devine.

Onsighted / Flashed by men 

With route beta on the internet, the distinction between an onsight (no prior beta) and a flash (had prior beta) is less relevant; it is recorded where noted.

:

 Super Crackinette – Saint Léger (FRA) – 10 February 2018 – First-ever 9a+ flash (not onsight) in history, by Adam Ondra.

:

 Southern Smoke Direct – Siurana (ESP) – 29 October 2012 – First-ever 9a flash (not onsight), by Adam Ondra.
 Estado Critico – Siurana (ESP) – 24 March 2013 – First-ever 9a onsight, by Alex Megos.
 Cabane au Canada – Rawyl (SUI) – 9 July 2013 – Second-ever 9a onsight, by Adam Ondra.
 Il Domani – Baltzola (ESP) – 3 May 2014 – Third-ever 9a onsight, by Adam Ondra.
 Water World – Pjakova Strecha (ESP) – November 2022 – Fourth-ever 9a onsight, by Adam Ondra.

:

Bizi Euskaraz – Etxauri (ESP) – December 11, 2007 – First-ever 8c+ onsight, by Patxi Usobiaga.
 Kidetasunaren Balio Erantsia – Etxauri (ESP) – March 6, 2011 – Second-ever 8c+ onsight, by Adam Ondra.
Bizi Euskaraz – Etxauri (ESP) – March 7, 2007 – Third-ever 8c+ onsight, by Adam Ondra.
 Powerade – Vadiello (La Caverna) (ESP) – March 9, 2011 – Fourth-ever 8c+ onsight, by Adam Ondra.

:

 White Zombie – Baltzola (ESP) – October 6, 2004 – First-ever 8c onsight, by Yuji Hirayama.
 Pata Negra – Rodellar (ESP) – August 10, 2005 – Second-ever 8c onsight, by Tomáš Mrázek.
 Gaua – Lezaia (ESP) – October 10, 2005 – Third-ever 8c onsight, by Patxi Usobiaga.
 La Teoria Dell'8a – Grotta dell'Aeronauta (ITA) – November 23, 2005 – Fourth-ever 8c onsight, by Tomáš Mrázek.

:

:

Liaisons Dangereuses – Les Calanques (Les Goudes), (FRA) – 1993 – First-ever 8b onsight, by 
Public Enemy – Cuenca, (ESP) – 1993 – Originally considered the first 8a+/8b onsight, by Stefan Glowacz, but consensus grade is now 8b.

:

(unknown)

:

:

Pol Pot – Verdon Gorge (FRA) – 1984 – First-ever 7c+ onsight, by Jerry Moffatt.
The Phoenix – Yosemite (FRA) – 1984 – Second-ever 7c+ onsight, by Jerry Moffatt.
Yesterday Direct – Mount Arapiles (AUS) – 1985 – Third-ever 7c+ (Australia 28) onsight, by Wolfgang Gullich.

:

Equinox – Joshua Tree (United States) – 1982 – First-ever 7c flash (not onsight), by Jerry Moffatt (originally considered 7b+).
La Polka des Ringards – Buoux (FRA) – 1982 – First-ever 7c onsight, by Patrick Edlinger.
Heisse Finger – Frankenjura (GER) – 1983 – Second-ever 7c onsight, by Jerry Moffatt.
Chasin' the Trane – Frankenjura (GER) – 1983 – Third-ever 7c onsight, by Jerry Moffatt.

:
Super Crack – Shawangunks (United States) – 1982 – First-ever 7b+ flash (not onsight), by Jerry Moffatt.
Captain crochet – Buoux (FRA) – 1982 – First-ever 7b+ onsight, by Patrick Edlinger.

Onsighted / Flashed by women 

With route beta on the internet, the distinction between an onsight (no prior beta) and a flash (had prior beta) is less relevant; it is recorded where noted.

:

 La Fabelita -– Santa Linya (ESP) – December 31, 2015 – First-ever female 8c flash, by Janja Garnbret (her flash of Rollito Sharma two days earlier was downgraded to 8b+).
Fish eye – Oliana (ESP) – November 1, 2021 – First-ever female 8c onsight, by Janja Garnbret
American Hustle – Oliana (ESP) – November 4, 2021 – Second-ever female 8c onsight, by Janja Garnbret

:

Hidrofobia – Montsant (ESP) – April, 2006 – First-ever female 8b+ onsight, by Josune Bereziartu (later considered possible 8b).
Humildes pa casa – Oliana (ESP) – April, 2010 – Second-ever female 8b+ onsight, by Maja Vidmar (later considered possible 8b+/c).
Omaha Beach – Red River Gorge (United States) – March, 2011 – Fourth-ever female 8b+ onsight, by Sasha Digiulian.

:

Steroid Performance – Horai (JPN) – December, 2004 – First-ever female 8b onsight, by Josune Bereziartu.
La Réserve – Saint-Léger-du-Ventoux, (FRA) – October, 2005 – Third-ever female 8b onsight, by Josune Bereziartu.
Fuente de Energia – La Caverna, Vadiello (ESP) – November, 2005 – Fourth-ever female 8b onsight, by Josune Bereziartu.

:

Bon Vintage – Terradets (ESP) – April, 2000 – First-ever female 8a+ onsight, by Josune Bereziartu.
Naska – Apellániz (ESP) – October, 2001 – Second-ever female 8a+ onsight, by Josune Bereziartu.
Déversé Satanique – Gorges du Loup (FRA) – October, 2001 – Third-ever female 8a+ onsight, by Josune Bereziartu.

:

Overdose – Lourmarin (FRA) – 1993 – First-ever female 8a/+ onsight, by Robyn Erbesfield.

Simon – Frankenjura (GER) – 1992 – First-ever female 8a onsight, by Lynn Hill.
Rampaneu – Frankenjura (GER) – 1992 – Second-ever female 8a onsight, by Robyn Erbesfield.

Free-solo by men
Notable free-solos above  range; does not include "highball" boulder ascents as the climbers here did not use padding or spotters.

:
 Panem et Circenses – Length:  – Muro di Pizarra , Arco (IT) – December 2019 – First-ever 8c free solo, by Alfredo Webber, aged 52.

:
 Kommunist – Length:  – Tyrol (AUT) – 2004 – The first-ever 8b+ free solo, by Alexander Huber.
 Darwin Dixit – Length:  – Margalef (ESP) – March 2008 – Originally 8c, but downgraded to 8b+, by Dave MacLeod.

:

 Compilation – Omblèze (FRA) – 1993– First-ever 8b free solo, by Alain Robert.
 Der Opportunist – Schleierfall (AUT) – 2003 – Second-ever 8b free solo, by Alexander Huber.

:

 Rêve de gosse – La Roche-des-Arnauds (FRA) – 1987 – First-ever 8a+ free solo, by Jean-Christophe Lafaille.

:

 Weed Killer – Raven Tor, Peak District (ENG) – 1986 – First-ever 7c free solo, by Wolfgang Gullich.

 Baby Apes – Joshua Tree National Park (United States) – 1982 – Probably the first-ever 7b free solo, by John Bachar.

Boulder problems

Solved by men

:

 – Lappnor, – October 2016 – First ascent by Nalle Hukkataival; unrepeated (2023).
 Return of the Sleepwalker – Red Rock Canyon, (United States) – April 2021 – First ascent by Daniel Woods; a sit start into Jimmy Webb's Sleepwalker ; unrepeated (2022).
William Bosi made a second repeat in November 2022 and felt is was easier than Honey Badger .

:

 – Varazze (ITA) – 2008 – Considered the first-ever , by Christian Core. First repeat in 2011 by Adam Ondra who proposed an 8C+ grade, describing the boulder as one of the hardest in the world, together with Terranova (see below). Third ascent by Nalle Hukkataival in 2014, and Niccolo Ceria in 2020, who were silent on grade.  In 2015, it was discovered that new holds were chipped on the route, which Core tried to fix but not with complete success, leaving one new crimp that Core felt does lower the grade. In 2021, a fifth repeat by Elias Lagnemma suggested a slightly lower grade of 8C/+ (using a kneepad).

 Terranova – Holstejn (Moravsky Kras, CZE) – November 2011 – Considered an early , by Adam Ondra; unrepeated (2023)

:

Monkey Wedding – Rocklands, (ZAF) – August 2002 – First-ever consensus  in history, by Fred Nicole. 
Black Eagle SDS – Rocklands, (ZAF) – August 2002 – Second-ever consensus  in history, by Fred Nicole. 
Walk Away SDS – Lake District, (ENG) – October 2002 – Considered the fourth-ever  in history, by John Gakins; unrepeated (2023)

:

 Radja – Branson, Valais, (SUI) – January 1996 – First-ever consensus  in history, by Fred Nicole.
 Nanuk – Königsee, (GER) – 1997 – After repeated in 2012, considered the second-ever  in history after Radja, by Klem Loskot.
 Coeur de Lion – Hueco Tanks, (United States) – 1998 – Third-ever consensus  in history, by Fred Nicole.

  – Cresciano (SUI) – October 28, 2000 – First ascent by Fred Nicole who proposed it as the world's first . Dreamtime became as iconic in bouldering history as Midnight Lightning in America due to its beauty and challenge.

:
 La Danse des Balrogs – Branson, Valais, (SUI) – 1992 – First-ever consensus  in history, by Fred Nicole.
 Enigma – Fontainebleau, (FRA) – 1992 – Considered the second-ever , by Philippe le Denmatt.
 The Dominator – Yosemite, (United States) – 1993 – Considered important early , by Jerry Moffatt.

:

 Trice – Boulder, Colorado, (United States) – 1975 – Ungraded and unrepeated for 32 years, but is now considered the world's first , by Jim Holloway.
 Slapshot – Flatirons, (United States) – 1977 – Ungraded and unrepeated for years, but considered one of the world's first , by Jim Holloway, and possibly .

:

:

:

:

:

:

:

Solved by women

:
 E la nave va – Lindental, (SUI) – 2003 – First-ever female ascent of an  boulder traverse, by Josune Bereziartu.

:
 La traversia De Balzola – Balzola, (ESP) – 2002 – First-ever female ascent of an  boulder traverse, by Josune Bereziartu.

FFA by Dai Koyamada.

:

:

:
 Berezi – Larraona, (SPA) – 2001 – Second-ever female ascent of a consensus , by Josune Bereziartu.

:
 Plain High Drifter – The Buttermilks, (United States) – March, 2001 – Second-ever female ascent of a consensus , by Lisa Rands.

:

:

:
 Midnight Lightning – Camp 4, Yosemite, (United States) – 1998 – Notable female ascent of a famous , by Lynn Hill.

Multi-pitch routes 

Given the smaller number of entries, the sections combine overall and female ascents:

Redpointed 

:

Repeated on November 21, 2016, by Adam Ondra in 8 days; Ondra lead every pitch.

:

:

 The "" of  big wall routes, all freed in 1993–1994:

:

:

:

:

Free-soloed

:

:

:

:

Deep-water solo routes

 (unconfirmed):
 Alasha – Mallorca (ESP) – September 12, 2016.  First ascent by Chris Sharma, who estimated its grade based on the effort it took to climb it without rope: "If it had bolts on it, it probably wouldn't be a 9b (5.15b). But when you're 60 feet up with no bolts, it takes the same amount of effort.”

:
 Es Pontàs – Mallorca (ESP) – September 26, 2007.  First ascent by Chris Sharma. Repeated by Jernej Kruder in November 2016. It features a  dyno that took Sharma over 50 attempts to stick.

See also 
History of rock climbing
List of first ascents

Notes

References

Further reading
 American online climbing website, Planet Mountain, on notable climbs, redpoints, onsight, free sole and male-female (1918–2012): 
 Czech climbing magazine, eMontana, on men's redpointing milestones from 6a to 9c:

External links 
 
 

grade milestones
grade milestones
Free solo climbing
grade milestones
History of sports
Climbing and mountaineering-related lists